The 2010 European Women's Handball Championship was held in Denmark and Norway from 7 to 19 December. It was the first European Championship hosted by two countries. Norway won their overall 5th gold medal, when they defeated first time finalist Sweden in the final. Romania claimed the bronze medal.

Venues
Three Danish and two Norwegian cities have been selected to host the 2010 Championship. The venues in Aalborg, Aarhus and Larvik were only used during the preliminary round. The fourth venue to be used in this round is located in Lillehammer, and was also one of the two venues in the main round. The other being MCH Indoor Arena in Herning, which was the only venue to be used in the final round.

Competition format
Preliminary round: 16 teams were divided into four groups. They played each other in a single round robin system, so each team played three matches. A win was worth two points, while a draw was worth one point. The top three teams from each group advanced to the main round.
Main round: 12 teams were divided in two groups. They played against the teams they didn't play in the preliminary round, so each team played 3 matches. All points from the preliminary round, except the points gained against the 4th place team in the preliminary group, were carried forward into the main round. Same round robin rules applied as in the preliminary round. Top 2 teams from each group advanced to the Semifinals, while the third placed team from each group advanced to the 5th–6th Place Play-off.
Final round: 6 teams play in the final weekend of the championships. 3rd place teams from the main round played in the 5th–6th Place Play-off. Other teams played in the Semi-finals. Losers of the Semi-finals advanced to the 3rd–4th Place Play-off, and winners advanced to the Final.

Ranking in preliminary and main round
If two or more teams were equal on points in the preliminary or main round, their ranking was determined as follows:

During the preliminary or main round matches:
 higher goal difference in all matches
 greater number of plus goals in all matches
 alphabetic order

After the completion of the preliminary and main round matches:
 better results in points gained in the direct encounter of the teams
 higher goal difference in the direct encounter of the teams
 greater number of plus goals in the direct encounter of the teams
 goal difference in all matches (achieved by subtraction)
 greater number of plus goals in all matches

Qualification

Qualification matches were played from September 2009 to May 2010. Following the new system introduced for the 2010 Men's Championship, all teams were included in the qualification round, except host Denmark and defending champion and host Norway. Teams were divided in 7 groups and the two top ranked teams from each group qualified.

Qualified teams

1 Bold indicates champion for that year

Squads

Each nation had to submit an initial squad of 28 players by 3 November 2010, but 12 of them became reserves when the final squad of 16 players was announced the day before the tournament starts.

Referees
13 Referee pairs were selected:
  Matija Gubica and Boris Milošević
  Jiří Opava and Pavel Válek
  Martin Gjeding and Mads Hansen
  Marlene Kroløkke Lythje and Karina Christiansen
  Charlotte Bonaventura and Julie Bonaventura
  Csaba Kékes and Pál Kékes 
  Slomo Cohen and Yoram Peretz
  Zigmārs Stoļarovs and Renārs Līcis
  Ivan Pavićević and Miloš Ražnatović
  Kjersti Arntsen and Ida Cecilie Gullaksen
  Diana-Carmen Florescu and Anamaria Duţă 
  Valerija Guseva and Stella Vartanyan
  Peter Brunovský and Vladimír Čanda

Seeding
The draw for the final tournament took place 17:00 CET on 5 June 2010 in Odense.

Preliminary round

Group A (Aalborg)

All times are Central European Time (UTC+1)

Group B (Aarhus)

All times are Central European Time (UTC+1)

Group C (Larvik)

All times are Central European Time (UTC+1)

Group D (Lillehammer)

All times are Central European Time (UTC+1)

Main round
Top 2 teams from each group advanced to the Semifinals, while the third placed team from each group competed in a 5th/6th place play-off.

Group I (Herning)

All times are Central European Time (UTC+1)

Group II (Lillehammer)

All times are Central European Time (UTC+1)

Final round

Knockout map

5th-place match

Semifinals

Bronze-medal match

Final

Final ranking and statistics

Source: EuroHandball.com

All-Star Team
Goalkeeper: 
Left wing: 
Left back: 
Playmaker: 
Pivot: 
Right back: 
Right wing: 
Chosen by team officials and EHF experts: EHF-Euro.com

Other awards
Most Valuable Player: 
Best Defence Player: 
Chosen by team officials and EHF experts: EHF-Euro.com

Top goalkeepers

Source: SportResult.com

Top goalscorers

Source: SportResult.com

Best defender

Source: SportResult.com

Most assists

Source: SportResult.com

References

External links
 Official site
 Euro-EHF page
 European Handball Federation
 Danish Handball Association
 Norwegian Handball Federation

 
European Women's Handball Championship
E
E
E
International handball competitions hosted by Denmark
International handball competitions hosted by Norway
Women's handball in Denmark
Women's handball in Norway
December 2010 sports events in Europe
Sport in Lillehammer
Sport in Aalborg
Sport in Herning
Larvik
International sports competitions in Copenhagen
2010 in Copenhagen
Sport in Aarhus